The Shanghai Library, which also houses the Shanghai Institute of Scientific and Technological Information, is the municipal library of Shanghai, China. It is the largest library in China. At 24 stories and 348 feet (106 m) tall, it is the second tallest library in the world, as well as one of the largest. The building has a tower that resembles a lighthouse.

The Library is located at 1557 Huaihai Zhong Lu, Xuhui District, Shanghai.

Early history: The Xujiahui (Zikawei) Library 

The Bibliotheca Zi-Ka-Wei is the first modern library to have been established in Shanghai. It was established in 1847.

Mergers 
In 1925, Shanghai East Library, the first library run by Chinese, was opened. In 1950, the Shanghai Cultural Heritage Managing Committee launched a campaign to collect books and after about a year, the collection grew to more than 200,000 volumes. Many scholars and celebrities contributed and some of them made large donations. The committee also started to buy books from abroad. After the mission schools and scientific establishments had been taken over by the Chinese government, the last foreign Jesuits left Xujiahui in 1951. The Xujiahui Library, along with other libraries formerly run by foreign groups, was placed under the control of the Shanghai Municipal Library, which had been established on July 22, 1952. This was the first large municipal public library in Shanghai. Marked the Shanghai library career in the founding of new China has taken a historic step.  The library had a collection of more than 700,000 volumes. the Shanghai Municipal Library of Historical Documents(formerly known as Shanghai private Hezhong library founded in 1939 by Jingkui Ye and Yuanji Zhang), The Xujiahui Library (Bibliotheca Zikawei), which reopened in 1977, also became a branch of the Shanghai Library. It was the second largest comprehensive public library in China, in terms of collection, services, and professional expertise.
In October 1995, the Shanghai library merged with the Shanghai Institute of science and technology information, and became the first provincial (city) level library and information association.

See also 

Libraries in the People's Republic of China
 National Library of China
Chinese Library Classification (CLC)
Archives in the People's Republic of China
Pudong Library

References 

 Brief History
 Shanghai Library

Further reading

External links 

 Official website

Libraries in Shanghai
Library buildings completed in 1996
Public libraries in China
Xuhui District
Libraries established in 1952